Paweł Baumann (11 June 1983 – 21 October 2016) was a Polish sprint canoer, born in Poznań, who competed since the early 2000s until his death. He won four medals at the ICF Canoe Sprint World Championships with two silvers (K-4 1000 m: 2006, 2007), and a bronze (K-4 500 m: 2006, K-4 1000 m: 2005).

Baumann also competed in two Summer Olympics, earning his best finish of sixth in the K-4 1000 m event at Beijing in 2008.

Baumann died on 21 October 2016 at a construction site where he worked.  He was 33.

References

Sports-reference.com profile

1983 births
Canoeists at the 2004 Summer Olympics
Canoeists at the 2008 Summer Olympics
2016 deaths
Olympic canoeists of Poland
Polish male canoeists
Sportspeople from Poznań
ICF Canoe Sprint World Championships medalists in kayak
21st-century Polish people